Roelof Diodati (Dordrecht, 28 July 1658 – Batavia, 10 March 1723) was a governor of Dutch Mauritius in the late 17th century.

Life
Diodati was from Swiss-Italian descent. His grandfather was Jean Diodati, a theologian, who translated the Bible into Italian. His father, born in Geneva, became a pastor of the Walloon church in Leiden in 1651.

It is not obvious Rodolfo Diodati was one of a twin. Both brothers took service at the Dutch East India Company. He became an accountant at the Cape from 1686 and then a merchant. He was appointed as governor of Mauritius from 1692-1703. In 1693 he had to deal with François Leguat. In 1695, a big hurricane devastated the island, several of the Burghers lost all theirs crops, many left the island.

Diodati seems to have been appointed in Suratte. Then he shifted to Batavia and he became a merchant and accountant on 4 January 1707. In 1709 he married Catharina Zaaiman, born on Dutch Mauritius. Her grandmother was Eva, a Khoikhoi interpreter for Jan van Riebeeck.

Diodati became opperhoofd at the VOC post at Dejima Japan on 31 May 1720 and died in Batavia 10 March 1723.

Notes

References
 Allister Macmillan, Mauritius illustrated: historical and descriptive, commercial and industrial facts, figures, and resources., London : W.H. & L. Collingridge, 1914

1658 births
1723 deaths
Dutch accountants
Dutch Governors of Mauritius
Dutch expatriates in Japan
17th-century Dutch colonial governors
Dutch people of Swiss descent
Dutch twins
People from Dordrecht
History of the foreign relations of Japan